This list of monospaced typefaces details standard monospaced fonts used in classical typesetting and printing.

Additional monospaced typefaces

Comic Code, a monospaced adaptation of the most infamous yet most popular casual font. https://tosche.net/fonts/comic-code
Comic Shanns, a Comic Sans inspired monospaced font. https://github.com/shannpersand/comic-shanns
New Heterodox Mono by Hao Chi Kiang https://github.com/hckiang/font-new-heterodox-mono
Proggy programming fonts
Teeny Tiny Pixls is a 5x3 pixel font "with many European characters included". Its homepage is https://chequered.ink/ but the download link; https://www.fontspace.com/chequered-ink/teeny-tiny-pixls appears to be broken. It can be downloaded from https://www.dafont.com/teeny-tiny-pixls.font
Terminal
Cozette : A tiny bitmap programming font optimized for coziness, https://github.com/slavfox/Cozette.

See also
List of display typefaces
List of sans serif typefaces
List of script typefaces
List of serif typefaces

References

 
Monospace
Monospace